Leptosciarella trochanterata is a species of fly in the family Sciaridae. It is found in the Palearctic.

References

External links
 Species id

Sciaridae
Insects described in 1851